Chayka (lit. "seagull") also known as Radioteknicheskaya Systema Dalyoloiy Navigatsii abbreviated as RSDN (lit. Russian Hyperbolic Radio Navigation System) is a Russian terrestrial radio navigation system, similar to Loran-C. It operates on similar frequencies around 100 kHz, and uses the same techniques of comparing both the envelope and the signal phase to accurately determine location. The systems differ primarily in details.

Chayka-Chains

Chayka, like LORAN-C, uses different pulse repetition frequencies (Group Repetition Intervals, or GRIs) to allow the identification of different stations operating on the same frequencies.

There are 5 Chayka chains in use:
GRI 8000 — Western (European) Russia Chayka Chain (1969, RSDN-3/10)
GRI 7950 — Eastern Russia Chayka Chain  (1986, RSDN-4)
GRI 5980 — Russian-American Chayka Chain (1995)
GRI 5960 — Northern Chayka Chain (1996, RSDN-5)
GRI 4970 — North-Western Chayka Chain
And also North-Caucasian, South-Ural (GRI 5970), Siberian, Angarsk, Sayansk, Transbaikalian, Far East chains deployed on the basis of low-power mobile stations RSDN-10.

Chayka Transmitters
The following Chayka transmitters work with very high power and may use very tall mast antennas (similar to LORAN-C transmitters). The masts at Dudinka and Taymylyr (demolished in 2009) were 460 metres high.

GRI 8000

GRI 7950

GRI 5980

GRI 5960 
(No longer in service)

GRI 4970

GRI 5970

See also
 LORAN, the Western counterpart of Chayka
 Alpha, the Russian counterpart of the Omega Navigation System, still in use as of November 2017.
 OMEGA, the Western counterpart of the Alpha Navigation System, no longer in use.
 Russian 460 metre radio mast

Radio navigation
Science and technology in the Soviet Union
Soviet inventions
Communications in the Soviet Union